Cirriphyllum is a genus of mosses belonging to the family Brachytheciaceae. The species of this genus are found in Eurasia and North America.

Species
The following species are recognised in the genus Cirriphyllum:

Cirriphyllum alare 
Cirriphyllum andinum 
Cirriphyllum brandegei 
Cirriphyllum brunneoalare 
Cirriphyllum cameratum 
Cirriphyllum cirrosum 
Cirriphyllum crassinervium 
Cirriphyllum meridense 
Cirriphyllum molliculum 
Cirriphyllum piliferum 
Cirriphyllum pirottae 
Cirriphyllum populeum
Cirriphyllum romanum 
Cirriphyllum subnerve 
Cirriphyllum tommasinii

References

Hypnales
Moss genera